Val-d'Oise's 1st constituency is one of ten French legislative constituencies in the department of Val-d'Oise. It is currently represented by Antoine Savignat of The Republicans (LR).

Historic representation

Elections

2022

2018 by-election

2017

2012

2007

 
 
 
 
 
 
 
 
|-
| colspan="8" bgcolor="#E9E9E9"|
|-

2002

 
 
 
 
 
 
 
|-
| colspan="8" bgcolor="#E9E9E9"|
|-

1997

 
 
 
 
 
 
 
 
|-
| colspan="8" bgcolor="#E9E9E9"|
|-

References

External links 
Results of legislative elections from 2002 to 2017 by constituency (Ministry of the Interior) 
Results of legislative elections from 1958 to 2012 by constituency (CDSP Sciences Po) 
Results of elections from 1958 to present by constituency (data.gouv.fr) 

1